The marsupial frogs are a disputed family (Amphignathodontidae) in the order Anura. When treated as a separate family, it consists of two genera, Gastrotheca and Flectonotus. The frogs are native to Neotropical America (Central and South America). Under the dominant view, they are treated as part of the family of Hemiphractidae.

References

Neobatrachia
Amphibian families
Taxa named by George Albert Boulenger
Neotropical realm fauna

es:Hemiphractidae
it:Hemiphractidae
pt:Amphignathodontidae